Betafo ("many roofs") is a town and urban municipality in Vakinankaratra Region in the Central Highlands of Madagascar. It is surrounded by volcanic peaks and is situated 22 km from Antsirabe. It is a typical Merina town in the Central Highlands.
 
The town had an estimated population of 34,336 in 2018 and is the administrative centre of Betafo District.

Geography 

Religion 
 FLM - Fiangonana Loterana Malagasy (Malagasy Lutheran Church)
The first Lutheran church in Madagascar was built in Betafo the Norwegian missionaries John Engh et Nils Nielsen in 1867.
 FJKM - Fiangonan'i Jesoa Kristy eto Madagasikara (Church of Jesus Christ in Madagascar)
Roman Catholic Diocese of Betafo

UNESCO World Heritage Site 
The irrigated rice paddies of the area are emblematic of this technology throughout the Malagasy highlands and were nominated to the Tentative List of UNESCO World Heritage Sites in Madagascar in 1997.

History
In the 19th century it was the capital of Vakinankaratra. The first Lutheran church in Madagascar was built in Betafo the Norwegian missionaries John Engh et Nils Nielsen in 1867.

Sports
The AS Standon Betafo is the local football club. It plays in the Vakinankaratra regional liga.

References

Sights
Tatamarina Lake
Antafofo Falls
 Tombs of Kings of Betafo

Populated places in Vakinankaratra